Lavrovka is a rural locality (a selo) in Listopadovskoye Rural Settlement, Gribanovsky District, Voronezh Oblast, Russia. The population was 142 as of 2010.

Geography 
Lavrovka is located 41 km west of Gribanovsky (the district's administrative centre) by road. Kalinovo is the nearest rural locality.

References 

Rural localities in Gribanovsky District